Uście Gorlickie  (Ustia Rus’ke) is a village in Gorlice County, Lesser Poland Voivodeship, in southern Poland, close to the border with Slovakia. It is the seat of the gmina (administrative district) called Gmina Uście Gorlickie.

The village has a population of 1,100.

References

Villages in Gorlice County